Coinage may refer to:
 Coins, standardized as currency
 Neologism, coinage of a new word
 COINage, numismatics magazine
 Tin coinage, a tax on refined tin 
 Protologism, coinage of a seldom used new term

See also
 Coining (disambiguation)
 Coin (disambiguation)